A Suspended Family Coaster is a steel inverted roller coaster built by Vekoma designed for families with no inversions. Just like all inverted roller coasters the train runs under the track with the seats directly attached to the wheel carriage. This latter attribute is what sets it apart from the older suspended swinging coaster, which runs under the track, but "swings" via a pivoting bar attached to the wheel carriage.

History
The Suspended Family Coaster debuted in 2001 with the Rugrats Runaway Reptar opening at Kings Island in Ohio, USA, and Silver Streak at sister park Canada's Wonderland. Several clones and variations have opened since.

The original designs featured trains with a safety system consisting of over-the-shoulder restraints. These restraints would lock into place with a belt-type connector which would be attached the seat base. All of the original track designs were of the 342m model with concrete footers. 

In March 2007, Vekoma debuted a new version of the Suspended Family Coaster, the 294 m model. The first installation of this was Jimmy Neutron's Atomic Flyer at Movie Park Germany. The ride differs from previous Suspended Family Coasters because it has a portable base-frame beneath the track rather than concrete footers and features a new train style with fully padded seats that use lap bar restraints.

One month later in April 2007, the 395 m model was launched at Gröna Lund in Sweden. The ride, which was named Kvasten, features the same redesigned trains as Jimmy Neutron's Atomic Flyer.

Models
All models have one train, which has 10 cars with 2 seats on each car. This caters for up to 650 riders per hour. All of the models feature lift hills powered by tires and magnetic brake runs.

 294 m — features a compact footprint where riders rise to  before completing a 48-second ride of turns and drops.
 342 m — riders are taken up  and go through a tight helix, followed by a series of small turns and drops for a one-and-a-half-minute ride.

Installations

Gallery

References

External links
 Official website

Mass-produced roller coasters
Vekoma